The Benny's Bar bombing was a paramilitary attack on 31 October 1972 in Belfast, Northern Ireland. A unit from the Ulster Freedom Fighters (UFF) of the Ulster Defence Association (UDA), a loyalist paramilitary group, detonated a no-warning car bomb outside the Irish Catholic-owned Benny's Bar in the dockland area of Sailortown, killing two young girls trick-or-treating in the area: Clare Hughes (4); and Paula Strong (6). Twelve of the pub's patrons were also injured in the explosion.

Background
Since its foundation in September 1971, the UDA had killed over 30 Catholic civilians and attacked a number of Catholic-owned businesses. On 13 September 1972, UDA members opened-fire inside the Catholic-owned Divis Castle Bar on Springfield Road, Belfast. One Catholic civilian, the owner's son, was killed. On 5 October it detonated a bomb at another Belfast pub, the Capital Bar, killing a Protestant civilian.

Bombing

On the evening of Tuesday 31 October 1972 in Sailortown (a mixed Protestant and Catholic community beside Belfast Docks), a large group of local children in fancy dress were playing outside their houses near a bonfire in Ship Street to celebrate Halloween. Two Catholic girls, Paula Strong (6) and Clare Hughes (4), both dressed as witches, were approached by a white-haired man carrying a suitcase. This individual is known to have asked the children for directions to Benny's Bar.

One of the girls gave this man the directions he requested. In response, this man gave the child two pence and walked along Garmoyle Street to its junction with Ship Street, where the pub was located. The two girls then went to the pub, knocked on the door and asked for pennies as a form of the traditional "trick-or-treating".

The explosion
The girls were in the vicinity of the Catholic-owned pub, which was full of patrons, when a maroon-coloured mini containing a  bomb exploded outside the building's Ship Street wall where it had been parked. No warning had been given. Part of the building collapsed onto the customers inside, injuring 12 people. Flying glass and masonry was hurled out into the street, instantly killing Paula Strong and fatally injuring Clare Hughes. A local woman who came upon the bodies of the little girls described what she had seen: "They were just like bloody bundles of rags lying there".

The explosion took place only  from the children's bonfire, and the bomb had a very short fuse. Houses and office buildings within a radius of several hundred yards suffered damage. The Strong family, who lived in the adjacent Marine Street felt the effects of the blast; Paula's brother, Tony said that there was a massive explosion, the entire house shook and pictures fell off the walls. Paula's father, Gerry Strong, had gone to the pub to help dig out those buried beneath the rubble and found the body of his daughter on the pavement outside. Clare Hughes's brother Kevin had been playing near the bonfire when the bomb detonated. Their home was in Ship Street, facing the bonfire, and their mother immediately rushed to the scene and brought the gravely-wounded Clare into the house. She died shortly afterwards in hospital.

The attack was the first major bombing in Northern Ireland for two weeks. With a total of 479 deaths—including those of the Bloody Sunday, Donegall Street, Springhill, Bloody Friday and Claudy atrocities—1972 was the bloodiest year of the 30-year ethno-political conflict known as the Troubles.

Aftermath

The funerals of Paula Strong and Clare Hughes were conducted at the Roman Catholic St Joseph's Chapel in Sailortown; many mourners lined the street and accompanied the coffins as they were carried inside the church. The girls were buried in Milltown Cemetery.

The bombing had been carried out by a unit of the Ulster Defence Association (UDA), which was the largest loyalist paramilitary organisation in Northern Ireland and which was legal at the time. Benny's Bar was targeted by the UDA as it was believed to have been an Irish republican drinking den. The three men who had driven the carbomb to the pub pleaded guilty to the murders. It emerged during the trial that one of the bombers had worked with Paula Strong's father at the docks.

The UDA continued attacking pubs owned or frequented by members of the Irish Catholic and nationalist community. Less than two months after the bombing, on 20 December, the UDA launched a gun attack on another Catholic-owned pub in Derry. That attack killed five Catholic civilians.

Benny's pub and the houses in Ship Street have since been torn down, leaving a small section of the street near the Garmoyle Street intersection extant. This is now an industrial zone. Ship Street and most of Sailortown was demolished to build the M2 motorway. There is a memorial plaque on an outside wall beneath a stained glass window at St Joseph's Chapel commemorating Paula Strong and Clare Hughes.

On the same day as the UDA bombed Benny's pub, the Red Hand Commando shot dead another Catholic civilian, 17-year-old James Kerr, who was shot while working in a garage on the Lisburn Road.

See also
Timeline of Ulster Defence Association actions

References

1972 crimes in the United Kingdom
1972 in Northern Ireland
Attacks on bars in Northern Ireland
Attacks on buildings and structures in 1972
Building bombings in Northern Ireland
Car and truck bombings in Northern Ireland
Explosions in 1972
Halloween events
Improvised explosive device bombings in 1972
Massacres in 1972
October 1972 events in the United Kingdom
Terrorist incidents in the United Kingdom in 1972
1972 crimes in Ireland
1970s murders in Northern Ireland
The Troubles in Belfast
Ulster Defence Association actions